John Kaag (born 1979) is an American philosopher and Chair and Professor of philosophy at the University of Massachusetts Lowell. Kaag specializes in American philosophy. His writing has been published in The Paris Review, The New York Times, and Harper’s Magazine.

Early life and education
Kaag was born to Jan and Rebecca Kaag.

Kaag received his Masters in Philosophy in 2003 from Pennsylvania State University and his PhD in Philosophy in 2007 from the University of Oregon. He did his post-doctoral study at the American Academy of Arts and Sciences and Harvard University.

Career
John Kaag is professor and Chair of Philosophy at the University of Massachusetts, Lowell. Kaag was a Miller Scholar at the Santa Fe Institute from 2019-2021, and is now an External Professor at the Santa Fe Institute.

In February 2023, Kaag delivered the lecture "William James and the Sick Soul" for Harvard Divinity School's William James Lectures on Religious Experience series.

Awards
Kaag’s book American Philosophy: A Love Story won the John Dewey Prize from the Society for U.S. Intellectual History.

Hiking with Nietzsche was named the Best Book of 2018 by NPR and a New York Times Editors’ Choice.

Bibliography
 Idealism, Pragmatism, and Feminism: The Philosophy of Ella Lyman Cabot (2011). Lanham: Rowman & Littlefield. .
 Thinking Through the Imagination: Aesthetics in Human Cognition (2014). New York: Fordham University Press. .
 American Philosophy: A Love Story (2016). New York: Farrar, Straus and Giroux. .
 Hiking with Nietzsche: On Becoming Who You Are (2018). New York: Farrar, Straus and Giroux. .
 Sick Souls, Healthy Minds: How William James Can Save Your Life (2020) Princeton: Princeton University Press. .
 Be Not Afraid of Life: In the Words of William James (2023) Princeton: Princeton University Press. .
 Henry at Work: Thoreau on Making a Living (2023) Princeton: Princeton University Press. .

See also
American philosophy
List of American philosophers

References

External links
John Kaag's webpage
John Kaag's UML faculty page

21st-century American non-fiction writers
21st-century American philosophers
21st-century essayists
21st-century American male writers
American male non-fiction writers
American philosophy academics
Philosophy writers
Philosophers of culture
Philosophers of education
Nietzsche scholars
Historians of philosophy
University of Massachusetts Lowell faculty
1979 births
Living people